Tornado (P-44) is the fourth ship of the Meteoro class, a new kind of offshore patrol vessels created for the Spanish Navy and called BAMs.

References

Ships of the Spanish Navy
Buque de Acción Marítima
Ships built in Spain
2011 ships